Diaporthe lagunensis is an endophytic filamentous fungus plant pathogen. It was described in 1920.

References

Fungal plant pathogens and diseases
lagunensis
Fungi described in 1920